The Farmers' Party was a political party in Jamaica. It contested national elections in 1955, receiving 2.7% of the vote, but failed to win a seat. It did not contest any further elections.

References

Defunct political parties in Jamaica
Defunct agrarian political parties
Political parties with year of establishment missing
Political parties with year of disestablishment missing